Rokto (English: Blood) is a 2016 Bangladeshi action film directed by Wajed Ali Sumon and produced by Abdul Aziz under the banner of Jaaz Multimedia. The film stars newcomer Ziaul Roshan and Pori Moni in lead roles. This film is a remake of 2013 Indian Tollywood (Telugu) film Chandee.

Plot
The antagonist here plans of a bomb blast in the SAARC summit to be held in Kolkata, organised by seven countries to shake the political conditions of the seven countries, so that he and his team can easily run their illegal arms and explosives businesses in those countries and can easily smuggle them. Agent Sania ruins their plan and the summit takes place fruitfully.

Cast
 Pori Moni as Agent Sania Sarkar
 Ziaul Roshan as Roshan Chowdhury
 Ashish Vidyarthi as RAW Chief, the main antagonist
 Prasun Guin
 Subrata
 Biplab Chatterjee as Home Minister Ratan Sinha
 Raja Dutta
 Amit Hassan as Bosco
 Meghna Halder

Production and release
It is produced by Jaaz Multimedia and Eskay Movies. It was an India-Bangladesh joint venture film. It was released in over 100 theatres in Bangladesh on 12 September 2016 (Eid al-Adha). The Daily Star described Rotkos box office performance as "mediocre".

Soundtrack

References

Further reading
 
 
 

Bengali-language Bangladeshi films
Bengali-language Indian films
2010s Bengali-language films
2016 action films
Bangladeshi action films
Films shot in Dhaka
Girls with guns films
Films set in Darjeeling
Films shot in West Bengal
Films scored by Savvy Gupta
Films scored by Akassh
Bangladeshi remakes of Telugu films
Bangladeshi remakes of Indian films
Bangladeshi films about revenge
Films directed by Wajed Ali Sumon
Films shot in Cox's Bazar
Jaaz Multimedia films